A dust explosion is the rapid combustion of fine particles suspended in the air within an enclosed location. Dust explosions can occur where any dispersed powdered combustible material is present in high-enough concentrations in the atmosphere or other oxidizing gaseous medium, such as pure oxygen. In cases when fuel plays the role of a combustible material, the explosion is known as a fuel-air explosion.

Dust explosions are a frequent hazard in coal mines, grain elevators, and other industrial environments. They are also commonly used by special effects artists, filmmakers, and pyrotechnicians, given their spectacular appearance and ability to be safely contained under certain carefully controlled conditions.

Thermobaric weapons exploit this principle by rapidly saturating an area with an easily combustible material and then igniting it to produce explosive force. These weapons are the most powerful non-nuclear weapons in existence.

Terminology 
If rapid combustion occurs in a confined space, enormous overpressures can build up, causing major structural damage and flying debris. The sudden release of energy from a "detonation" can produce a shockwave, either in open air or in a confined space. If the spread of flame is at subsonic speed, the phenomenon is sometimes called a "deflagration", although looser usage calls both phenomena "explosions".

Dust explosions may be classified as being either "primary" or "secondary" in nature. Primary dust explosions may occur inside process equipment or similar enclosures, and are generally controlled by pressure relief through purpose-built ducting to the external atmosphere. Secondary dust explosions are the result of dust accumulation inside a building being disturbed and ignited by the primary explosion, resulting in a much more dangerous uncontrolled explosion that can affect the entire structure. Historically, fatalities from dust explosions have largely been the result of secondary dust explosions.

Conditions required 

There are five necessary conditions for a dust explosion:

 A combustible dust
 The dust is dispersed in the air at a sufficiently high concentration
 There is an oxidant (typically atmospheric oxygen)
 There is an ignition source
 The area is confined—a building can be an enclosure

Sources of dust 

Many common materials which are known to burn can generate a dust explosion, such as coal dust and sawdust. In addition, many otherwise mundane organic materials can also be dispersed into a dangerous dust cloud, such as grain, flour, starch, sugar, powdered milk, cocoa, coffee, and pollen. Powdered metals (such as aluminum, magnesium, and titanium) can form explosive suspensions in air, if finely divided.

A gigantic explosion of flour dust destroyed a mill in Minnesota on May 2, 1878, killing 14 workers at the Washburn A Mill and another four in adjacent buildings. A similar problem occurs in sawmills and other places dedicated to woodworking.

Since the advent of industrial production–scale metal powder–based additive manufacturing (AM) in the 2010s, there is growing need for more information and experience with preventing dust explosions and fires from the traces of excess metal powder sometimes left over after laser sintering or other fusion methods. For example, in machining operations downstream of the AM build, excess powder liberated from porosities in the support structures can be exposed to sparks from the cutting interface. Efforts are underway not only to build this knowledgebase within the industry but also to share it with local fire departments, who do periodic fire-safety inspections of businesses in their districts and who can expect to answer alarms at shops or plants where AM is now part of the production mix. 

Although not strictly a dust, paper particles emitted during processing – especially rolling, unrolling, calendaring/slitting, and sheet-cutting – are also known to pose an explosion hazard. Enclosed paper mill areas subject to such dangers commonly maintain very high air humidities to reduce the chance of airborne paper dust explosions.

In special effects pyrotechnics, lycopodium powder and non-dairy creamer are two common means of producing safe, controlled fire effects.

To support rapid combustion, the dust must consist of very small particles with a high surface area to volume ratio, thereby making the collective or combined surface area of all the particles very large in comparison to a dust of larger particles. Dust is defined as powders with particles less than about 500 micrometres in diameter, but finer dust will present a much greater hazard than coarse particles by virtue of the larger total surface area of all the particles.

Concentration 
Below a certain value, the lower explosive limit (LEL), there is insufficient dust to support the combustion at the rate required for an explosion. A combustible concentration at or below 25% of the LEL is considered safe. Similarly, if the fuel to air ratio increases above the upper explosive limit (UEL), there is insufficient oxidant to permit combustion to continue at the necessary rate.

Determining the minimum explosive concentration or maximum explosive concentration of dusts in air is difficult, and consulting different sources can lead to quite different results. Typical explosive ranges in air are from few dozens grams/m3 for the minimum limit, to few kg/m3 for the maximum limit.  For example, the LEL for sawdust has been determined to be between 40 and 50 grams/m3. It depends on many factors including the type of material used.

Oxidant 
Typically, normal atmospheric oxygen can be sufficient to support a dust explosion if the other necessary conditions are also present. High-oxygen or pure oxygen environments are considered to be especially hazardous, as are strong oxidizing gases such as chlorine and fluorine. Also, particulate suspensions of compounds with a high oxidative potential, such as peroxides, chlorates, nitrates, perchlorates, and dichromates, can increase risk of an explosion if combustible materials are also present.

Sources of ignition 
There are many sources of ignition, and a naked flame need not be the only one: over one half of the dust explosions in Germany in 2005 were from non-flame sources. Common sources of ignition include:
 electrostatic discharge (e.g. an improperly installed conveyor belt, which can act like a Van de Graaff generator)
 friction 
 electrical arcing from machinery or other equipment
 hot surfaces (e.g. overheated bearings)
 fire
 self-ignition

However, it is often difficult to determine the exact source of ignition when investigating after an explosion. When a source cannot be found, ignition will often be attributed to static electricity. Static charges can be generated by external sources, or can be internally generated by friction at the surfaces of particles themselves as they collide or move past one another.

Mechanism 
Dusts have a very large surface area compared to their mass. Since burning can only occur at the surface of a solid or liquid, where it can react with oxygen, this causes dusts to be much more flammable than bulk materials. This greatly-increased surface area allows the material to burn much faster, and the extremely small mass of each particle allows them to catch on fire with much less energy than the bulk material, as there is no heat loss to conduction within the material.

When this mixture of fuel and air is ignited, especially in a confined space such as a warehouse or silo, a significant increase in pressure is created, often more than sufficient to demolish the structure. Even materials that are traditionally thought of as nonflammable (such as aluminum), or slow burning (such as wood), can produce a powerful explosion when finely divided, and can be ignited by even a small spark.

Effects
A dust explosion can cause major damage to structures, equipment, and personnel from violent overpressure or shockwave effects. Flying objects and debris can cause further damage. Intense radiant heat from a fireball can ignite the surroundings, or cause severe skin burns in unprotected persons. In a tightly enclosed space, the sudden depletion of oxygen can cause asphyxiation.  Where the dust is carbon based (such as in a coal mine), incomplete combustion may cause large amounts of carbon monoxide (the miners' after-damp) to be created.  This can cause more deaths than the original explosion as well as hindering rescue attempts.

Protection and mitigation 

Much research has been carried out in Europe and elsewhere to understand how to control these dangers, but dust explosions still occur. The alternatives for making processes and plants safer depend on the industry.

In the coal mining industry, a methane explosion can initiate a coal dust explosion, which can then engulf an entire mine pit. As a precaution, incombustible stone dust may be spread along mine roadways, or stored in trays hanging from the roof, to dilute the coal dust stirred up by a shockwave to the point where it cannot burn. Mines may also be sprayed with water to inhibit ignition.

Some industries exclude oxygen from dust-raising  processes, a precaution known as "inerting". Typically this uses nitrogen, carbon dioxide, or argon, which are incombustible gases which can displace oxygen. The same method is also used in large storage tanks where flammable vapors can accumulate. However, use of oxygen-free gases brings a risk of asphyxiation of the workers. Workers who need illumination in enclosed spaces where a dust explosion is a high risk often use lamps designed for underwater divers, as they have no risk of producing an open spark due to their sealed waterproof design.

Good housekeeping practices, such as eliminating build-up of combustible dust deposits that could be disturbed and lead to a secondary explosion, also help mitigate the problem.

Best engineering control measures which can be found in the National Fire Protection Association (NFPA) Combustible Dust Standards include:
 Wetting
 Oxidant concentration reduction 
 Deflagration venting
 Deflagration pressure containment
 Deflagration suppression
 Deflagration venting through a dust retention and flame-arresting device

Notable incidents 

Dust clouds are a common source of explosions, causing an estimated 2,000 explosions annually in Europe. The table lists notable incidents worldwide.

See also 
 Air to fuel ratio

References

External links

Incidents in France and the US:
 Combustible dust explosion investigation products from the Chemical Safety Board 
 Combustible Dust Policy Institute-ATEX 
 OSHA case studies of dust explosions

Protecting process plant and grain handling facilities from the risk of dust hazard explosions:
 Hazard Monitoring Equipment – Selection, Installation and Maintenance
 Seminars for Combustible Dust Safety
 http://www.hse.gov.uk/pubns/books/hsg103.htm – HSE (UK) advice on safe handling of combustible dust.

 
Chemical processes
Occupational safety and health